There are several rivers called the Clarke River.
 Clarke River (Queensland), Australia
 Clarke River (Grey District), New Zealand
 Clarke River (Tasman), Tasman Region, New Zealand
 Clarke River (Westland District), New Zealand

See also
 Clark River, tributary of the Aorere River, New Zealand
 Clarke's River, Dominica